Carabus rugosus is a species of either black or brown-coloured ground beetle in the Carabinae subfamily that can be found in France, Portugal, Spain, and Morocco.

References

rugosus
Beetles described in 1792
Beetles of Europe